The Wellington Collection is a large art and militaria collection housed at Apsley House in London. It mainly consists of paintings, including 83 formerly in the Spanish royal collection, given to Arthur Wellesley, 1st Duke of Wellington, who was Prime Minister as well as the general commanding the British forces to victory in the Napoleonic Wars. It also includes his collection of furniture, sculpture, porcelain, the silver centrepiece made for him in Portugal around 1815, and many other artworks and memorabilia relating to his career.

Gerald Wellesley, 7th Duke of Wellington, gave the house and its most important contents to the nation in 1947, but the Wellington Museum Act that year established the family's right to occupy just over half the house "so long as there is a Duke of Wellington". The Wellington Collection, along with the house, is managed by English Heritage and is open to the public.

List of paintings

The notable collection of over 200 paintings on display includes 83 paintings from the Spanish royal collection.  At the Battle of Vitoria in northern Spain in 1813, the British army captured a carriage full of paintings from the Spanish royal collection.  Joseph Bonaparte, whose brother Napoleon had made him King of Spain, had already lost Madrid, escaping with over 200 paintings in the carriage.  Most had been removed from their frames and were rolled up in a large "imperial" or travelling-chest, along with state papers, love letters, and other documents.  After a quick look, Wellington and his staff thought there was nothing very important or valuable in it, but sent the imperial by sea to his brother William, Lord Maryborough (as he then was) in London for a proper check.  His brother called in William Seguier, later the first keeper of the National Gallery, who recognised the quality of the paintings and compiled a list of 165 of the most important.

Wellington then informed the court of the restored Bourbon King Ferdinand VII of Spain of the incident, to make arrangements for their return, but the king said Wellington should keep them as a gift.  The Arnolfini Portrait by Jan van Eyck was also in the carriage, but (being conveniently small) appears to have been looted by the soldiers, and next appeared in London in 1816 in the possession of a Scottish colonel who had been at Vitoria.

Not all the paintings acquired by the first Duke have been on public display.
For example, Danaë, an important painting by Titian, long thought to be a copy, was kept in part of the house not open to the public. Danaë and two other Titians reattributed at the same time were briefly put on public exhibition, for the first time, in 2015.

The painting collection includes work by:

American School
John Singleton Copley

British School
 Sir William Beechey
 John Burnet
 George Dawe
 John Hoppner
 Edwin Landseer
 Sir Thomas Lawrence
 William Salter
 Sir David Wilkie

Dutch School
 Pieter de Hooch
 Jan van Huysum
 Nicolaes Maes
 Willem van Mieris
 Antonis Mor
 Aernout van der Neer
 Adriaen van Ostade
 Cornelius van Poelenburgh
 Jan Steen
 Willem van de Velde the Younger
 Jan Victors

Flemish School
 Paul Brill
 Adriaen Brouwer
 Jan Brueghel the Elder
 Anthony van Dyck
 Antony Francis van der Meulen
 Rubens
 David Teniers the Younger

French School

Claude Lorrain
 Claude-Joseph Vernet
Robert Lefèvre

German School
 Hans von Aachen
 Adam Elsheimer
 Anton Raphael Mengs

Italian School
 Leandro Bassano
 Cecco del Caravaggio
 Giuseppe Cesari
 Carlo Cignani
 Antonio da Correggio (including Agony in the Garden)
 Luca Giordano
 Antiveduto Grammatica
 Guercino
 Giovanni Paolo Panini
 Guido Reni
 Giulio Romano
 Salvator Rosa
 Francesco Trevisani
 Marcello Venusti

Spanish School
 Velázquez, Diego (4 paintings, including The Waterseller of Seville)
 Francisco Goya (1 painting)
 Bartolomé Esteban Murillo (3 paintings)
 Jusepe de Ribera (3 paintings)

Other art
Antonio Canova's heroic marble nude of Napoleon as Mars the Peacemaker (1802–10) is holding a gilded Nike in the palm of his right hand, and stands  to the raised left hand holding a staff. It was set up for a time in the Louvre and was bought by the Government for Wellington in 1816 and is placed at the bottom of a stairwell (in some people's opinion rather dismissively).

The 1st Duke received many gifts from European continental rulers that are displayed in the House:
 A pair of large candelabra of Siberian porphyry, ormolu & malachite centre and two side tables, presented by Nicholas I of Russia. 
 A pair of Swedish porphyry urns, from King Charles XIV John of Sweden.
 A dinner service of Berlin porcelain, from Frederick William III of Prussia, to honour the Duke after his victory over Napoleon at the Battle of Waterloo in 1815. This is now partly set out as for a dinner.
 The Egyptian revival dinner service of Sèvres porcelain, from Louis XVIII of France.
 The silver and silver-gilt Portuguese service of over a thousand pieces, from the Portuguese Council of Regency.
 The Saxon Service of Meissen porcelain, from Frederick Augustus I of Saxony.
 Seven marshal's batons from various European continental rulers (and another three from the British monarchs). Nine of them are on display at Apsley House (the Russian baton was stolen in the 1960s).

The Duke's uniform and other memorabilia may be seen in the basement.

See also
Stratfield Saye House, the country home of the Dukes of Wellington

Notes

References
"Titian at Apsley House": "Titian at Apsley House", PDF, Exhibition Guide, 2015, English Heritage 
Kauffmann, C.M., revised by Susan Jenkins, Catalogue of Paintings in the Wellington Museum, Apsley House, 2009, English Heritage/Paul Holberton Publishing, 342 page PDF,

External links
 
 

 
Former private collections in the United Kingdom
Private collections in the United Kingdom
Art collections in the United Kingdom